The Launceston Synagogue is a heritage-listed building located in St. John's Street, Tasmania, Australia, that served as a synagogue from 1846 until 1871, and again during the  until its closure in 1961 and reopened in 1984.

History
In the 1840s the sizeable Launceston Hebrew Congregation borrowed £500 to purchase the land to build the synagogue. The synagogue was designed by Richard Peter Lambeth and was built in 1844 by Tasmanian builders Barton and Bennell. The synagogue was consecrated in 1846.

After the Hobart Synagogue, the building is Australia's second-oldest synagogue, the oldest place of non-Christian worship in Launceston, and a rare example of an Egyptian revival architecture in Australia. The building features a distinctly trapezoidal facade and main window bearing the Star of David with a single balcony on the inside accessed via the rear of the building.

The synagogue closed as a house of worship in 1871, re-opening again in the 1930s. In 1923, Sim Crawcour and Harry Joseph were instrumental in its renovation.

In 1989, the building became listed with National Trust of Australia who have been taking care of renovations and maintenance.

Convicts
In 1847 it was arranged that all Jews in Hobart and Launceston prisons should have the privilege of attending synagogue and refraining from work on the Sabbath. Pass holders were permitted to be counted in a minyan, but they could not have honors bestowed on them.

See also

 List of synagogues in Australia and New Zealand
 History of the Jews in Australia

References

External links
 Photographs

Further reading

Buildings and structures in Launceston, Tasmania
Tourist attractions in Tasmania
History of Tasmania
Synagogues in Australia
Egyptian Revival architecture
Religious buildings and structures in Tasmania
National Trust of Australia
1844 establishments in Australia
Synagogues completed in 1846